Alejandro Velázquez Lara (born 27 December 1974) is a Mexican politician from the Party of the Democratic Revolution. In 2009, he served as Deputy of the LX Legislature of the Mexican Congress representing the State of Mexico.

References

1974 births
Living people
Politicians from the State of Mexico
Party of the Democratic Revolution politicians
21st-century Mexican politicians
Deputies of the LX Legislature of Mexico
Members of the Chamber of Deputies (Mexico) for the State of Mexico